John Oller is an American biographer, historian, and former Wall Street attorney.

Early life and education
Oller was born in Huron, Ohio. He earned a B.A. in journalism, graduating summa cum laude from Ohio State University in 1979, where he wrote and edited the daily student newspaper, the Lantern, and interned as a reporter at The Plain Dealer in Cleveland and the Rochester Times-Union. Oller graduated magna cum laude from Georgetown University Law Center in 1982.

Career

Attorney
Following law school, Oller became an associate and later a partner in the litigation department of white-shoe law firm Willkie Farr & Gallagher in New York City, where he represented Major League Baseball, including in the George Brett Pine Tar Incident as well as the Pete Rose sports betting case, as described in the Dowd Report. In 2004, he authored a history of the firm. Oller retired from legal practice in 2011 to focus on writing.

Works

Rogues' Gallery (2021)
Rogues' Gallery: The Birth of Modern Policing and Organized Crime in Gilded Age New York is a history of crime and policing in New York City from approximately 1870 to 1910.

White Shoe (2019)
White Shoe: How a New Breed of Wall Street Lawyers Changed Big Business and the American Century is a history of the American white-shoe firm.

The Swamp Fox (2016)
The Swamp Fox: How Francis Marion Saved the American Revolution is a biography of American guerrilla warrior Francis Marion.

American Queen (2014)
American Queen: The Rise and Fall of Kate Chase Sprague: Civil War "Belle of the North" and Gilded Age Woman of Scandal  is a biography of Washington political hostess Kate Chase.

An All-American Murder (2014)
An All-American Murder is about the 1975 murder of 14-year-old Christie Lynn Mullins in Columbus, Ohio, a case that went unsolved for 40 years. Oller, a student at Ohio State University in Columbus when the murder occurred, began investigating the case in 2013. He had just finished writing American Queen, and stumbled into the cold case on a website for amateur unsolved-homicide sleuths as he was looking for a new writing project. In 2015 the Columbus police department credited Oller with tracking down the information that solved the case; after a renewed investigation, the police concluded that Mullins was murdered by Henry Newell Jr., who had died of cancer in September 2013, at age 63.

One Firm – A Short History of Willkie Farr & Gallagher, 1888 –  (2004).
One Firm – A Short History of Willkie Farr & Gallagher, 1888 –  is a history of the firm at which Oller was a law partner.

Jean Arthur: The Actress Nobody Knew (1997)
Jean Arthur: The Actress Nobody Knew is a biography of American actress Jean Arthur.

Personal life
A golfer, Oller won Willkie Farr & Gallagher's annual golf tournament in Florida a record four times.

References

20th-century American biographers
Ohio State University alumni
Georgetown University Law Center alumni
20th-century American lawyers
People associated with Willkie Farr & Gallagher
20th-century American non-fiction writers
21st-century American non-fiction writers
Living people
Year of birth missing (living people)